Olivine is a mineral (a solid solution series) and a mineral group.

Olivine may also refer to:

 Olivine, colour
 Olivine Creek, in British Columbia
 Olivine Point, in the South Orkney Islands
 Olivine River, in New Zealand